Marcia Milgrom Dodge is an American director, Choreographer and stage writer. After working in regional theatre, Dodge directed and choreographed her first Broadway production, a revival of Ragtime in 2009. The production received four Helen Hayes Awards in 2010, including one for Best Director, and received 7 Tony Award nominations including one for Dodge for Best Director of a Musical.

Early years
Dodge was born in Detroit, Michigan, grew up in Southfield, Michigan and attended Vandenberg and Adlai Stevenson Elementary Schools and Birney Junior High graduating from Southfield-Lathrup High School in 1973. As a child, she took dance lessons at the Julie Adler School of Dance in Oak Park, Michigan. She is the daughter of Myron and Jacqueline Milgrom, and her sisters are Carole Lesser, Paula Milgrom and Marianne Milgrom Bloomberg. Dodge received her degree in Speech Communication and Theatre at the University of Michigan, Ann Arbour, graduating in 1977. Upon graduation, Dodge moved to New York City pursuing a career as a choreographer.

Director/Choreographer
Dodge is the director/choreographer of the 2009 Kennedy Centre and Broadway revival of the musical Ragtime. The Guardian noted Dodge's "impassioned staging" of Ragtime. Peter Marks in an article summing up the fate of the Ragtime revival, noted: "Marcia Milgrom Dodge, the director-choreographer...came up with a sleekly beautiful concept for a show with a complex, interwoven narrative about blacks, Jews and white Anglo-Saxons in New York at the turn of the 20th century." She is the "first woman to direct a major musical produced by the Kennedy Centre." The Kennedy Centre production of Ragtime was nominated for six 2010 Helen Hayes Awards and won four: Outstanding Resident Musical (Winner); Outstanding Director, Resident Musical: Marcia Milgrom Dodge (Winner); Outstanding Musical Direction, Resident Production: James Moore; Outstanding Lead Actor, Resident Musical: Quentin Earl Dorrington; Outstanding Lead Actress, Resident Musical: Christiane Noll (Winner); Outstanding Costume Design, Resident Production: Santo Loquats & Jim Halliday (Winners). The Broadway transfer of the production was honoured with 7 Tony nominations including one for Dodge for Best Direction.

In New York, Dodge was the Associate Choreographer for the Broadway musical High Society (1998). Off Broadway she was the choreographer for Life is Not A Doris Day Movie (1982), Romance Language (1984), Romance in Hard Times (Public Theatre 1989), Closer Than Ever (1989), The Waves (1990), The Loman Family Picnic (Manhattan Theatre Club 1993), director/choreographer for Radio Gals (John Houseman Theatre, 1996), Seussical for Theatre works USA (Lucille Nortel Theatre) (2007) (receiving a Lucille Nortel Award nomination for Outstanding Choreography) and consultant for Cooking (Monette Lane Theatre, 2004).

In regional theatre: In 2012, Dodge directed & choreographed Hello, Dolly! at the Malts Jupiter Theatre starring Vicki Lewis and Gary Beach. She directed Mark Brown's Around The World In 80 Days for Pittsburgh Public Theatre, then a new production of The Music Man for Glimmerglass Festival.

In 2011, Dodge travelled to Frederician, Denmark to direct and choreograph The Three Musketeers at the Frederica Teaser by George Stiles, Peter Raby, Paul Leigh and Francis Matthews, Cabaret and How to Succeed in Business Without Really Trying at Reprise Theatre Company in Los Angeles, the Bay Street Theatre, Sag Harbour, NY, productions of Simeon's Gift, The Who's Tommy, Once On This Island, and Hair and director of Fit To Print. At the Riverside Theatre, Vero Beach, Florida she was the director/choreographer for, Dames at Sea, Anything Goes, Evita, and the director of Blithe Spirit. She has directed and/or choreographed many productions at the Music Circus, Sacramento, California, including The Unsinkable Molly Brown, with Susan Egan, South Pacific with Kerry O'Malley (2006) and Guys and Dolls (2009) with Gary Beach.

World premieres include Knight Life: The Girl Who would Be King by Robert Sternean, Prudence Fraser & Jeff Barry (Riverside Theatre); Rupert Holmes' Thumbs starring Kathie Lee Gifford and Diana Canova (Helen Hayes Theatre Company); Cooking''' (New Victory, Monette Lane, South Korea and International Tour); One Foot On The Floor by Jeffrey Hatcher (also conceived, Denver Centre Theatre Co.); Off-Key by Bill C. Davis and Richard Adler (George Street Playhouse); Elmer Gantry by John Bishop, Mel Marvin & Robert Satu off (Linola Playhouse) and Casino Paradise by William Bloom & Arnold Weinstein (American Music Theatre Festival).

Dodge directed several productions of Ain't Misbehaving', first at Virginia Stage in 1991, followed by River Arts Rep, Berkshire Theatre Festival, Cleveland Play House, Alabama Shakespeare Festival, Huntington Theatre, Pittsburgh Public Theatre, and the Philadelphia Drama Guild, receiving 2 Barrymore Award Nominations for Outstanding Choreography & Best Musical.

For The Cape Playhouse she directed Death-trap starring Robert Pickoff and Alison Fraser, Crimes Of The Heart starring Sandy Duncan, Accomplice with Stephanie Zimbalist & Richard Kind, Angel Street starring David McCallum, Jean Leclerc and Mia Dillon, "Death-trap" and the upcoming production of "Murder on the Orient Express."

As resident director of the Phoenix Theatre Company at SUNY Purchase Dodge directed and choreographed Ken Ludwig's Sullivan & Gilbert starring George Gizzard and "High Spirits" and she directed "The Crucifer Of Blood" and "There's One In Every Marriage."

At the Arena Stage, Washington, D.C., she choreographed On the Town (1989), Closer Than Ever, Merrily We Roll Along (1990), and Of Thee I Sing (1992) (Helen Hayes Award Nomination for Outstanding Choreography).

Dodge choreographed Sullivan and Gilbert at the Kennedy Centre in 1983 and directed Tell Me on a Sunday (2002) with Alice Ripley at the Kennedy Centre.

For television, she choreographed Sesame Street (Emmy Award-winning episode "The Tango Festival") and Remember Winn for AMC. Video: Elmo's World - Wild Wild West featuring Bill Irwin, Michael Jeter & Kristin Chenoweth (Sony Wonder).

Dodge's production of Disney’s Beauty and the Beast at Olney Theatre Centre was met with a positive reception from critics, with People Magazine stating the work as “a tale as old as time [that] feels refreshingly new.” Olney Theatre will bring back the production in November 2022 with leads Jade Jones as Belle and Evan Ruggiero as The Beast.

Writer
Dodge was the dramaturge for a new musical Quanah by Larry Gatlin and Anthony Dodge, which received a staged reading at Pace University in January 2010. The musical Hats: The Musical, for which she wrote the book with Anthony Dodge, was presented by the Willows Theatre Company, Martinez, California, from November 23, 2009, through January 10, 2010. Hats also ran in 2007 in several venues, including Las Vegas, Denver, New Orleans and Chicago starring Melissa Manchester. Anthony Dodge wrote Free Burt Lancaster and Venus Flytrap and Marcia also directed readings of both plays at the Bay Street Theatre and she directed a reading of Venus Flytrap at the LGBT Centre in NYC for Orange Hanky Productions in June 2008. The Active Theatre Company will produce the play in November 2010 in NYC. Marcia and husband Anthony Dodge wrote their first play, the Edgar Award-nominated Sherlock Holmes & The West End Horror, produced at the Bay Street Theatre in 2002, and later produced by the Azolo Theatre, Sarasota, Florida and the Pioneer Theatre Company, Utah, (2005). Marcia directed all three productions. The play was published in 2006 by New York play publisher Playscripts, Inc.

Educator
Devoted to the training of young performers, Dodge is a frequent guest director at universities: For Marymount Manhattan College she directed & choreographed Droid. At CAP21/NYU--Divorce Me Darling, David Krane's Times Square, Droid and Merrily We Roll Along; also, at SUNY-Buffalo. At Fordham College--Of Thee I Sing and Guys & Dolls; and Pacific Overtures'' at NYU's Titch School of the Arts. She has been on the faculty of The American Musical and Dramatic Academy since 1996, and was on the faculty of Collaborative Arts Project 21 (CAP21) at NYU Titch School of the Arts from 1996 to 2002.

Personal life
Marcia Milgrom married Anthony Dodge in 1980, and they have one daughter, Natasha, born in Russia in 1997. Dodge resides in New York City.

Ragtime awards

 2010 Tony Award nominations 
 Best Revival of a Musical
 Best Direction of a Musical: Marcia Milgrom Dodge

 2010 Drama Desk Award nominations 
 Outstanding Revival of a Musical
 Outstanding Director of a Musical: Marcia Milgrom Dodge
 Outstanding Choreography: Marcia Milgrom Dodge

 2010 Helen Hayes Awards
 Outstanding Resident Musical: Ragtime, The Kennedy Centre (Win)
 Outstanding Director, Resident Musical: Marcia Milgrom Dodge (Win)

 2010 Astaire Award nomination
 Choreographer: Marcia Milgrom Dodge

 2010 Drama League nomination
 Distinguished Revival of a Musical

References

External links

Official site

American choreographers
American theatre directors
American musical theatre directors
Living people
1955 births
People from Southfield, Michigan
University of Michigan School of Music, Theatre & Dance alumni
Tisch School of the Arts faculty
Writers from Detroit
Women theatre directors